The Hohe Dock  lies in the Austrian federal state of Salzburg and, at 3,348 metres, is one of the highest peaks in the Glockner Group. The mountain, with its striking trapezoidal shape, dominates the orographically left-hand side of the valley of the Fuscher Ache and the panorama above the northern ramp of the Großglockner High Alpine Road.

Climbing route 
The start point is the head of the valley at Fusch an der Großglocknerstraße (Ferleiten). The summit is ascended via the  Schwarzenberg Hut (2,267 m) along a signed, high alpine path.

References

External links
 Climbing the Hohe Dock - (Czech / English)

Gallery 

Glockner Group
Mountains of the Alps
Mountains of Salzburg (state)
Fusch an der Großglocknerstraße